Rush Hour is a 1941 British Public Information short film made by the wartime Ministry of Information and designed to pass on an important message to cinemagoers in a humorous manner.  The film was directed by Anthony Asquith and produced by Edward Black.

Rush Hour was filmed as a series of short comedy sequences, illustrating the various degrees of chaos and confusion arising from public transport being overwhelmed with passengers at peak times.  Its twin targets were employers, to whom the desirability of staggered working hours was stressed, and casual leisure travellers, who were exhorted: "Shopping? Visiting?  Then get home early at your ease – leave rush-hour seats for workers, please!"

Cast
 Muriel George as Violet
 Hay Petrie as Bus Conductor
 Beatrice Varley as Violet's friend
 Charles Victor as Bus Inspector
 David Keir as Man at Bus Stop
 Robert Brooks Turner as Man at Bus Stop
 Merle Tottenham as Woman at Bus Stop

References

External links 
 
 

1941 films
1941 short films
British short films
Films directed by Anthony Asquith
Public information films
British black-and-white films
1940s educational films
1940s English-language films
British educational films